The Saipan-class aircraft carriers were a class of two light carriers  and  built for the United States Navy during World War II.  Like the nine  light carriers, they were based on cruiser hulls.  However, they differed from the earlier light carriers in that they were built from the keel up as carriers, and were based on heavy rather than light cruiser hulls. Completed too late for the war, they served as carriers until the mid-1950s, then were converted into a command ship (Wright) and a major communications relay ship (Saipan) in the late 1950s, and served in those roles until 1970. They were both scrapped in 1980.

Origins and design

Intended to offset expected wartime losses of the smaller  light carriers, the two ships of the Saipan class were designed from the keel up as aircraft carriers, with many improvements based on experience with the Independence class.

The Saipan class was based on the hull and machinery of the 13,600-ton  heavy cruiser hull rather than the smaller  light cruiser upon which the Independence class was built, allowing better seakeeping, improved hull subdivision, enhanced protection, greater magazine volume, a stronger flight deck, an expanded air group and a slightly higher speed than in the Independence class.  Compared to their cruiser half-sisters, they were eight feet wider in beam to accommodate the size and weight of the hangar and flight deck.

Service

They had very brief service lives as light carriers, serving respectively from 1946 to 1957 and 1947 to 1956.  As carriers, they were swiftly outdated by the deckspace-eating jet aircraft of the 1950s, and quickly rendered far too small in a military environment where the -long s were increasingly seen as cramped and small.  The two ships were seen as valuable hulls, however, with a large void space within the ship that could easily be translated to other use.  They were converted for non-carrier duties in the late 1950s, Saipan as the communications relay ship USS Arlington and Wright as a command ship. In these capacities the two ships served until being decommissioned in 1970 and scrapped in 1980.

Ships in class

References

Light aircraft carrier classes
 Saipan class aircraft carrier
 Saipan class aircraft carrier
 Saipan class aircraft carrier
 Saipan class aircraft carrier
 Saipan class escort carrier